Uzunçayır is a village in the Kozluk District, Batman Province, Turkey. The village is populated by Kurds of the Reşkotan tribe and had a population of 389 in 2021.

The hamlets of Aksaray, Başeğmez, Bulgurlu, Esentepe, Gülovası, Hasköy, Mercan, Sahabe, Seyhan, Uzunyayla, Üzümlü and Yeşilköy.

References

Villages in Kozluk District

Kurdish settlements in Batman Province